Kenneth Neigh (June 1, 1908 – May 27, 1996) was a United Presbyterian Church leader.

Life and career 
Kenneth Neigh was born in Salem, Ohio, and grew up in Lisbon, Ohio as the son of a lumberyard manager. He studied at Ohio Wesleyan College and was awarded a doctor of divinity degree from the McCormick Theological Seminary in Chicago in 1936.

After serving as a minister in Allen Park, a suburb of Detroit until 1946, he was named vice president and acting president of McCormick. He merged the Detroit and Michigan synods and worked as an executive there before assuming the office of the general secretary of the Board of National Missions of the United Presbytierian Church in 1959. He served there until his retirement in 1972.

According to his obituary in the New York Times, he was considered by the magazine Christian Century to be the "architect of the modern missions movement." Among other projects, five bankrupt United Mine Workers medical centers in Appalachia were funded, the Head Start program in Mississippi was created, and legal assistance was provided to many civil rights advocates.

He married his high school sweetheart, Jane. They had two children, a son who was killed in an auto accident in the late 80s and a daughter.

References

1908 births
1996 deaths
Presbyterian Church in the United States of America ministers
United Presbyterian Church in the United States of America ministers
20th-century American clergy